A transmissible cancer is a cancer cell or cluster of cancer cells that can be transferred between individuals without the involvement of an infectious agent, such as an oncovirus. The evolution of transmissible cancer has occurred naturally in other animal species, but human cancer transmission is rare.

Humans
In humans, a significant fraction of Kaposi's sarcoma occurring after transplantation may be due to tumorous outgrowth of donor cells. Although Kaposi's sarcoma is caused by a virus (Kaposi's sarcoma-associated herpesvirus), in these cases, it appears likely that transmission of virus-infected tumor cells—rather than the free virus—caused tumors in the transplant recipients.

In 2007, four people (3 women & 1 man) received different organ transplants (liver, both lungs and kidneys) from a 53-year-old woman who had recently died from intracranial bleeding. Before transplantation, the organ donor was deemed to have no signs of cancer upon medical examination. Later, the organ recipients developed metastatic breast cancer from the organs and three of them died from the cancer between 2009–2017.

In 2014, a case of parasite-to-host cancer transmission occurred in a 41-year-old man in Colombia with a compromised immune system due to HIV. The man's tumor cells were shown to have originated from the dwarf tapeworm, Hymenolepis nana. In the 1990s, an undifferentiated pleomorphic sarcoma was transmitted from a patient to a surgeon when he injured his hand during an operation – within five months a tumor developed on the hand. The tumor was removed. In 1986, a laboratory worker accidentally bruised herself with the needles she was using to inject colonic cancer cells into mice. She developed a small tumor on her hand in two weeks.

Other animals
Contagious cancers are known to occur in dogs, Tasmanian devils, Syrian hamsters, and some marine bivalves including soft-shell clams. These cancers have a relatively stable genome as they are transmitted. Recent studies have tested whether other highly prevalent wildlife cancers, such as urogenital carcinomas in Californian sea lions, could also be contagious but so far there is no evidence for this.

Clonally transmissible cancer, caused by a clone of malignant cells rather than a virus, is an extremely rare disease modality, with few transmissible cancers being known. The evolution of transmissible cancer is unlikely, because the cell clone must be adapted to survive a physical transmission of living cells between hosts, and must be able to survive in the environment of a new host's immune system. Animals that have undergone population bottlenecks may be at greater risks of contracting transmissible cancers. Because of their transmission, it was initially thought that these diseases were caused by the transfer of oncoviruses, in the manner of cervical cancer caused by human papillomavirus. However, canine transmissible venereal tumor (CTVT) mutes the expression of the immune response, whereas the Syrian hamster disease spreads due to lack of genetic diversity.

Canine transmissible venereal tumor

Canine transmissible venereal tumor (CTVT) is sexually transmitted cancer in dogs. It was first described medically by a veterinary practitioner in London in 1810. It was experimentally transplanted between dogs in 1876 by M. A. Novinsky (1841–1914). A single malignant clone of CTVT cells has colonized dogs worldwide, representing the oldest known malignant cell line in continuous propagation, a fact that was uncovered in 2006. Researchers deduced that the CTVT went through 2 million mutations to reach its actual state, and inferred it started to develop in ancient dog species 11 000 years ago.

Contagious reticulum cell sarcoma

Contagious reticulum cell sarcoma of the Syrian hamster can be transmitted from one Syrian hamster to another through various mechanisms. It has been seen to spread within a laboratory population, presumably through gnawing at tumours and cannibalism. It can also be spread by means of the bite of the mosquito Aedes aegypti.

Devil facial tumour disease

Devil facial tumour disease (DFTD) is a transmissible parasitic cancer in the Tasmanian devil. Since its discovery in 1996, DFTD has spread and infected 4/5 of all Tasmanian devils and threatens them with extinction. A new DFTD tumor-type cancer was recently uncovered on 5 Tasmanian devils (DFT2), histologically different from DFT1, leading researchers to believe that the Tasmanian devil "is particularly prone to the emergence of transmissible cancers".

Bivalves
Soft-shell clams, Mya arenaria, have been found to be vulnerable to a transmissible neoplasm of the hemolymphatic system — effectively, leukemia. The cells have infected clam beds hundreds of miles from each other, making this clonally transmissible cancer the only one that does not require contact for transmission.

Horizontally transmitted cancers have also been discovered in three other species of marine bivalves: bay mussels (Mytilus trossulus), common cockles (Cerastoderma edule) and golden carpet shell clams (Polititapes aureus). The golden carpet shell clam cancer was found to have been transmitted from another species, the pullet carpet shell (Venerupis corrugata).

See also 
 Allotransplantation
 Anne-Maree Pearse
 Myxosporea – SCANDAL hypothesis

References

External links 

 Clonally transmissible cancers  at plos.org.

Carcinogenesis